Associated Wholesalers, Inc. was a retailers' cooperative based in Robesonia, Pennsylvania. It distributed food to member owners who are independent supermarkets. It owns the Shurfine Markets supermarket chain in Pennsylvania.

Associated Wholesalers, Inc. was one of the cooperative wholesalers which own the Retailer Owned Research Company (RORC) of Fort Worth, Texas.  RORC technology was used in AWI owned Shurfine Markets.

Associated Wholesalers, Inc. filed for Chapter 11 bankruptcy protection on Sunday September 7, 2014. It was acquired by C&S Wholesale Grocers.

References

External links 
 Associated Wholesalers, Inc. web site
 RORC members lit

Retailers' cooperatives in the United States
American companies established in 1962
Retail companies established in 1962
American companies disestablished in 2014
Retail companies disestablished in 2014
Supermarkets of the United States
Privately held companies based in Pennsylvania
Companies based in Berks County, Pennsylvania
1962 establishments in Pennsylvania
2014 disestablishments in Pennsylvania
Companies that filed for Chapter 11 bankruptcy in 2014